Głowacki, Glovatsky, Hlovatskyi, Golovatsky, or Holovatskyi is a surname derived from golva (Slavic for "head"). Its Ukrainian and Belarusian forms are generally transcribed beginning with an 'H' but may also be written with a 'G'.

People 
Notable people with the surname include:
Aleksander Głowacki ( Bolesław Prus; 1847–1912), Polish novelist, essayist, and journalist
Anton Glovatsky (born 1988), Russian ice hockey player
Arkadiusz Głowacki (born 1979), Polish footballer
Andrzej Głowacki, Polish philosopher, professor, and graphic artist
Antoni Głowacki (1910–1980), Polish fighter pilot
Dawid Głowacki (born 1987), Polish cyclist
Jan Nepomucen Głowacki (1802–1847), Polish painter
Janusz Głowacki (1938–2017), Polish-born American playwright, essayist, and screenwriter
Jerzy Głowacki (born 1950), Polish cyclist and Olympics competitor
Krzysztof Głowacki (born 1986), Polish boxer
Léon Glovacki (1928–2009), French footballer
Marcin Głowacki (born 1973), Polish ice dancer and Olympics competitor
Piotr Głowacki (born 1980), Polish actor
Ryszard Głowacki (born 1937), Polish geological engineer, writer, and publicist
Vadim Glovatsky (1970–2015), Kazakhstani ice hockey player and Olympics competitor
Wojciech Bartosz Głowacki (1758–1794), Polish insurgent

See also 
Bartosz Głowacki (armoured train) (1919–1939), a Polish army train

References

Polish-language surnames